Alexandru Maftei is a Romanian film director. He graduated from the Caragiale Academy of Theatrical Arts and Cinematography in 1994. His first feature film was Fii cu ochii pe fericire from 1999. After that he worked in advertisement and television for several years before he made his second feature film, the romantic comedy Hello! How Are You? from 2011. His film Miss Christina was the third most successful domestic film in Romania in 2013.

Filmography
 În fiecare zi e noapte (1995) - short film
 Fii cu ochii pe fericire (1999) 
 Lombarzilor 8 (2006) - TV series, 7 episodes
 Cu un pas înainte (2007) - TV series, 3 episodes
 Hello! How Are You? (Bună, ce faci?) (2011)
 Miss Christina (Domnișoara Christina) (2013)

References

Living people
Romanian film directors
Romanian screenwriters
Year of birth missing (living people)
Place of birth missing (living people)
Caragiale National University of Theatre and Film alumni